Isabel Gauthier is a cognitive neuroscientist currently holding the position of David K. Wilson Professor of Psychology and head of the Object Perception Lab at Vanderbilt University’s Department of Psychology.  In 2000, with the support of the James S. McDonnell Foundation, she founded the Perceptual Expertise Network (PEN), which now comprises over ten labs based across North America. In 2006 PEN became part of the NSF-funded Temporal Dynamics of Learning Center (TDLC).

Awards and recognition
Gauthier has received the Young Investigator Award, Cognitive Neuroscience Society (2002), the APA Distinguished Scientific Award for Early Career Contribution to Psychology in the area of Behavioral/Cognitive Neuroscience (2003) and the Troland research award from the National Academy of Sciences "For seminal experiments on the role of visual expertise in the recognition of complex objects including faces and for exploration of brain areas activated by this recognition." (2008). She was elected Fellow of the Association for Psychological Science (2010). In 2012, Gauthier was elected Fellow of the Society of Experimental Psychologists. In 2015, she was named "SEC professor of the year" by the Southeastern Conference. In 2021 Gauthier received the Psychonomic Society Mid-Career award. 

Beginning in 2011, Gauthier serves as chief editor of the Journal of Experimental Psychology: General, where she introduced a brief report format and made report of effect sizes and consideration of power an editorial priority. Since 2016, she serves as chief editor of the Journal of Experimental Psychology: Human Perception and Performance.

Biography 
Gauthier was born in Montreal, Quebec, Canada, in 1971. She acquired her PhD at Yale University (1993-1998). Her dissertation Dissecting face recognition: The role of expertise and level of categorization in object recognition was conducted under the supervision of  Michael J, Tarr.  She held post-doctoral positions at Yale and MIT before joining the faculty of Vanderbilt University in 1999.

Research 
Gauthier has researched many topics involved in perception, with a focus on the role of perceptual expertise in category-specific effects in domains such as faces, letters or musical notation. She incorporates different techniques to study these topics, including functional magnetic resonance imaging (fMRI), event-related potentials (ERP), and behavioral training studies using novel objects (e.g., Greebles, YUFOs, Ziggerins).

One brain area frequently investigated by Gauthier and colleagues using fMRI is the fusiform face area (FFA). The FFA is believed to play an important role in face recognition, but Gauthier’s research has examined the role that FFA may play in the expert perception of non-face objects, such as cars in car experts.

Gauthier's research has a current h-index = 66 as of September 2021, according to Google Scholar), see Google Scholar page

Representative papers 
 Gauthier, I., & Nelson, C. A. (2001). The development of face expertise. Current Opinion in Neurobiology, 11(2), 219-224.
Gauthier, I., Skudlarski, P., Gore, J. C., & Anderson, A. W. (2000). Expertise for cars and birds recruits brain areas involved in face recognition. Nature Neuroscience, 3(2), 191-197.
Gauthier, I., & Tarr, M. J. (1997). Becoming a “Greeble” expert: Exploring mechanisms for face recognition. Vision Research, 37(12), 1673-1682.
Gauthier, I., Tarr, M. J., Anderson, A. W., Skudlarski, P., & Gore, J. C. (1999). Activation of the middle fusiform'face area'increases with expertise in recognizing novel objects. Nature Neuroscience, 2(6), 568-573.
Gauthier, I., Tarr, M. J., Moylan, J., Skudlarski, P., Gore, J. C., & Anderson, A. W. (2000). The fusiform “face area” is part of a network that processes faces at the individual level. Journal of Cognitive Neuroscience, 12(3), 495-504.

References

External links 
 Object Perception Lab
 Isabel's Vanderbilt Professor Bio
 

1971 births
Living people
Vanderbilt University faculty
Canadian cognitive neuroscientists
Canadian women neuroscientists
Scientists from Montreal